Cyrille Regis, MBE (9 February 1958 – 14 January 2018) was a professional footballer who played as a forward. His professional playing career spanned 19 years, where he made 614 league appearances and scored 158 league goals, most prolifically at West Bromwich Albion and Coventry City. Born in French Guiana, Regis also won five caps with the England national team.

Early life
Regis was born on 9 February 1958 in Maripasoula, French Guiana, the son of Robert Regis, a labourer from Saint Lucia and Mathilde Regis, a seamstress. His father moved to England in 1962, with the rest of the family, including Cyrille, following a year later. Cyrille grew up in Harlesden, located in the Borough of Brent, and attended Cardinal Hinsley Maths & Computing College.At primary school, Regis said that he was a much better cricketer than footballer.  “I was an outdoor child. So I just wanted to play cricket outside, and I played much more cricket back then because football was just another sport I did without any real passion”.

After leaving school, Regis trained as an electrician, earning a City and Guilds diploma; he continued to practise the trade until his move into professional football. He was a cousin of the athlete John Regis.

Club career

Non-League
The 1975–76 season saw Regis move to Athenian League club Molesey, for whom he scored around 25 goals during his one campaign for the club. He was then approached by Boreham Wood, but did not join them. Instead he went on to join semi-professional Hayes of the Isthmian League, signing on 7 July 1976.

Regis was spotted by West Bromwich Albion's chief scout Ronnie Allen, who recommended that the First Division club should sign him. With the Albion directors unsure of paying a four-figure fee for such a young, unproven player, Allen offered to fund any initial payment from his own pocket, so sure was he that Regis would make it in the top tier of English football. The transfer took place in May 1977, for an up-front fee of £5,000, plus another £5,000 after 20 appearances.

West Bromwich Albion
Shortly after bringing Regis to Albion, Allen took over as team manager, following the resignation of his predecessor Johnny Giles. Regis made his first team debut in a League Cup match against Rotherham United on 31 August 1977, scoring twice in a 4–0 win. Three days later Regis made his league debut in a 2–1 victory over Middlesbrough. Again he found the net, taking the ball from the halfway line to the penalty area before scoring with a right-foot drive. Middlesbrough's David Mills, who later became a teammate of Regis at Albion, described it as "a goal of sheer brilliance".

Regis also scored in his first FA Cup match in January 1978, helping Albion to beat Blackpool 4–1. A few days later, Albion appointed a new manager, Ron Atkinson. Ronnie Allen had departed in late December to manage the Saudi Arabia national team and John Wile, the club's captain, had acted as caretaker manager in the interim.

Whilst a West Bromwich Albion player he played in a benefit match for Len Cantello, that saw a team of white players play against a team of black players.

Coventry City
In 1984 Regis joined Coventry City for a fee of £250,000. With Coventry, Regis won the only major trophy in his career, the 1987 FA Cup. Johan Cruyff wanted to sign Regis for AFC Ajax as a replacement for AC Milan-bound Marco van Basten, but he accused his own club's directors of delaying the deal until Regis's FA Cup exploits took him out of the Dutch club's price range. Regis later became the first Coventry City player to score a winning goal at Anfield, in their first ever league win there (1–0) in November 1989. This came a season after he had also scored in City's first ever top flight win over Aston Villa at Highfield Road (2–1).

Aston Villa 
Before the 1991–92 season, Regis joined Aston Villa on a free transfer, reuniting him with his former manager at West Brom, Ron Atkinson. He was one of six Villa players who made their debut for the club on the opening day of the season, scoring in a 3–2 win away to Sheffield Wednesday. Regis made over 40 appearances in his first season for Villa, and finished as the club's leading league goalscorer, joint with Dwight Yorke.

Wolverhampton Wanderers 
Following the end of 1992–93, Regis moved to West Midlands rivals, Wolverhampton Wanderers. His stay with Wolves only lasted for one season, during which time he made 22 appearances, scoring twice.

Wycombe Wanderers 
Regis joined Wycombe Wanderers in August 1994. Forming a striking partnership with Simon Garner, he scored ten goals in his only season at the Buckinghamshire club.

Chester City 

Regis ended his professional career by playing in the Third Division with Chester City. He scored seven times in 29 league appearances, helping Chester finish 8th, before retiring due to injury in October 1996.

International career

Regis's dual French and British nationality made him eligible to play for either the English or French national sides, but it was England that he chose to represent. He made his England under-21 debut on 19 September 1978, in a 2–1 victory over the Denmark under-21s in Hvidovre. His first England B game was a 1–0 win against Czechoslovakia B in Prague on 28 November 1978. He played in two further matches for the B team in 1980. He scored his first goal for the England under-21s on 5 June 1979, in a 3–1 away win against Bulgaria. The result helped England reach the latter stages of the 1980 European Championship, although it was the only one out of six qualifying matches in which Regis participated. He played in the away legs of both the quarter-final and semi-final, where England lost to East Germany. In all he played six times for the under-21s, scoring three goals.

Despite winning five caps for the full England side, Regis never played the full 90 minutes for his country at senior level; he played as a substitute three times and was himself substituted twice. He made his international debut on 23 February 1982 in a 4–0 win over Northern Ireland in the Home International Championship at Wembley. Regis came on as a substitute for Trevor Francis in the 65th minute. His final international appearance for England was in 1987 against Turkey at Wembley, which ended in an 8–0 win for the home side, where he came on for the last 20 minutes.

He was the third black player to be capped by England at the highest level after Viv Anderson and Laurie Cunningham.

Personal life
His younger brother is former player Dave Regis, and his nephew is Jason Roberts.

Regis became an evangelical Christian after a car crash claimed the life of his friend and former teammate Laurie Cunningham in 1989. He and Cunningham had been involved in a similar crash two years earlier. After retiring from playing, Regis worked in a variety of coaching roles before becoming an accredited football agent with the Stellar Group Ltd. He was the uncle of footballer Jason Roberts, for whom he acted as an agent, and cousin of sprinter John Regis.

He was awarded an honorary fellowship by the University of Wolverhampton in 2001. In 2004, Regis was voted as West Bromwich Albion's all time Cult Hero in a BBC Sport poll, gaining 65% of the vote. In the same year he was named as one of West Bromwich Albion's 16 greatest players, in a poll organised as part of the club's 125th anniversary celebrations. Regis and his wife Julia visited water-related projects in Ethiopia in 2007, as part of their continued support for WaterAid.

Regis won the Coventry City London Supporters' Club Player of the Year in 1986/87 and regularly comes in high in any legend polls for the club. In 2007/08 a Coventry City Hall of Fame picture gallery was erected at the Ricoh Arena, containing thirty Coventry greats from the club's entire history, whom he was among.

He was appointed Member of the Order of the British Empire (MBE) in the 2008 Birthday Honours.

Death and legacy 
Regis died of a heart attack on 14 January 2018. He was 59 years old.

The under-21 match between England and Romania at Molineux on 24 March 2018 was designated the Cyrille Regis International in tribute. England won the match, 2–1. On 28 July 2018, two of Regis' former clubs (West Bromwich Albion and Coventry City) played in a friendly match dubbed the 'Regis Shield'; West Bromwich won 5–2.

Career statistics

Honours 
Hayes

 Premier Midweek Floodlight League: 1975–76

Coventry City
 FA Cup: 1986–87

Individual
 English Football Hall of Fame: 2019
 Coventry City Hall of Fame
 PFA Merit Award: 2018

See also
 List of England international footballers born outside England

References

Bibliography

Bowler, D & Bains, J (2000) Samba in the Smethwick End: Regis, Cunningham, Batson and the Football Revolution 
Brown, Jim (2000) Coventry City: An Illustrated History 

Rees, Paul. (2014). "The Three Degrees The Men Who Changed British Football Forever". .
Regis, Cyrille (2010) Cyrille Regis: My Story

External links
 
 Englandstats.com profile
 Cyrille Regis in the Hayes F.C. Hall of Fame
 Cyrille Regis in the A-Z of Hayes F.C. 1909–
 
 Entry at The Black Presence in Britain site

1958 births
2018 deaths
People from Maripasoula
English footballers
England international footballers
England under-21 international footballers
England B international footballers
French Guianan footballers
French people of French Guianan descent
French emigrants to England
Hayes F.C. players
West Bromwich Albion F.C. players
Coventry City F.C. players
Aston Villa F.C. players
Wolverhampton Wanderers F.C. players
Wycombe Wanderers F.C. players
Chester City F.C. players
Premier League players
English Football League players
West Bromwich Albion F.C. non-playing staff
West Bromwich Albion F.C. managers
Black British sportsmen
Members of the Order of the British Empire
People from Harlesden
Footballers from the London Borough of Brent
Naturalised citizens of the United Kingdom
Association football forwards
Molesey F.C. players
French Guianan people of Saint Lucian descent
French people of Saint Lucian descent
English people of Saint Lucian descent
English football managers
English Football Hall of Fame inductees
FA Cup Final players